Shenelle Henry (born 13 March 1994) is a Trinidad and Tobago footballer who plays as a midfielder. She has been a member of the Trinidad and Tobago women's national team.

International career
Henry capped for Trinidad and Tobago at senior level during the 2015 Pan American Games and the 2018 CONCACAF Women's Championship.

References

1994 births
Living people
Women's association football forwards
Women's association football midfielders
Trinidad and Tobago women's footballers
Trinidad and Tobago women's international footballers
Pan American Games competitors for Trinidad and Tobago
Footballers at the 2015 Pan American Games
College women's soccer players in the United States
Cisco College alumni
Wiley College alumni
Trinidad and Tobago expatriate women's footballers
Trinidad and Tobago expatriate sportspeople in the United States
Expatriate women's soccer players in the United States